Ten Mile or Tenmile may refer to:

10-mile run, running competition over ten miles
Tenmile, Kentucky
Ten Mile, Lewis County, Missouri
Ten Mile, Macon County, Missouri
Tenmile, Coos County, Oregon

Tenmile, Douglas County, Oregon
Ten Mile, Pennsylvania
Ten Mile, Tennessee
Tenmile, West Virginia
Tenmile Range

See also
Battle of the Tenth Milestone, fought 533 between the Vandals and the Byzantine Empire
Tenmile Creek (disambiguation)
Ten Mile Creek Bridge (disambiguation)
Ten Mile Lake (disambiguation)
Ten Mile Point (disambiguation)
Ten Mile River (disambiguation) 
Ten Mile Run (disambiguation)
Ten Miles